HMS Hornet was a former Dutch hoy of 60 tons that the British Admiralty purchased in 1794 for service with the Royal Navy. After the Admiralty purchased Hornet she underwent fitting between March and 18 April at Deptford. Lieutenant Robert Bayley commissioned her in April. She was paid off a year later in April 1795, sold in July, and broken up at Sheerness the same year.

Citations and references
Citations

References

Hoys of the Royal Navy
1790s ships